Dana Velďáková (born 3 June 1981 in Rožňava, Czechoslovakia) is a former  Slovak athlete specialising in the triple jump. A very regular jumper, qualifying for the final at almost every major competition, her biggest senior successes are two bronze medals at the European Athletics Indoor Championships, in 2009 and 2011, and the silver at the 2007 Summer Universiade.

Her personal bests in the event are 14.51 metres outdoors, achieved in May 2008 in Pavia, and 14.40 metres indoors achieved in March 2009 in Turin. Both are current national records.

She has a twin sister named Jana, who is a long jumper.

International competition

References

External links
 
 
 
 Dana Velďáková at the Rio.Olympic.sk 

1981 births
Living people
Slovak female triple jumpers
Athletes (track and field) at the 2008 Summer Olympics
Athletes (track and field) at the 2012 Summer Olympics
Athletes (track and field) at the 2016 Summer Olympics
Olympic athletes of Slovakia
Slovak twins
Twin sportspeople
People from Rožňava
World Athletics Championships athletes for Slovakia
European Games silver medalists for Slovakia
Athletes (track and field) at the 2015 European Games
European Games medalists in athletics
Universiade medalists in athletics (track and field)
Universiade silver medalists for Slovakia
Medalists at the 2007 Summer Universiade